Djong Victorin Yu (born June 2, 1957 in Seoul) is a South Korean conductor and composer.  Yu has made numerous CDs in London with the Philharmonia Orchestra.  His first CD with the Philharmonia Orchestra (titled Russian Masterpieces) earned the following review: “His Mussorgsky Pictures reminds me of the young Karajan of the 1950s . . . stunning . . . marvellous.”

Link
 Djong Victorin Yu Official Website

References

South Korean conductors (music)
South Korean classical composers
University of Pennsylvania alumni
Living people
1957 births
Male classical composers
20th-century South Korean musicians
20th-century conductors (music)
20th-century classical composers
21st-century South Korean musicians
21st-century conductors (music)
21st-century classical composers
Musicians from Seoul
20th-century male musicians
21st-century male musicians